The Dance of Salomé is the title of a series of 160 works consisting of 85 paintings and 75 drawings created by Nabil Kanso in 1988 and 1995. It is based on biblical and literary works with particular reference to Oscar Wilde’s 1891 play and Richard Strauss’s 1905 opera. 
The primary subject of all the works in the series is Salomé who is depicted in a sequence of scenes reflecting various nuances of perception in distinctive dance movement.

References

External links
Dance of Salome

Paintings depicting Salome
Modern paintings
Series of paintings by Nabil Kanso
1988 paintings
Salome, Dance of Salome (paintings) 
1995 paintings
Dance in art